La Roche-Chalais is a commune in the Dordogne department in Nouvelle-Aquitaine in southwestern France.

Population
In 1972 the former communes of Saint-Michel-de-Rivière and Saint-Michel-l'Écluse-et-Léparon were absorbed into La Roche-Chalais.

See also
Communes of the Dordogne department

References

Communes of Dordogne